Mohamed Zouaoui, is a Tunisian-born actor living in Italy. In 2004 he made his first appearance on the television miniseries Posso chiamarti amore?.  He also acted in Nassiryia - Per non dimenticare (Nasiriyah - Lest we forget), Capri, and RIS Delitti Imperfetti (Scientific Investigations Unit: Imperfect Crimes).  In 2007, he acted in the miniseries Liberi di giocare. His cinema debut was the 2008 film L'ultimo pulcinella, directed by Maurizio Scapparo. In 2009 he starred in I mostri oggi, and in 2010 appeared in The Father and the Foreigner. In 2010 he acted in I fiori di Kirkuk, directed by Fariborz Kamkari. For this role he earned several awards, including the "Golden Globe" 2011 Globo d'Oro for Best New Actor.

In 2012 he starred in the independent film Carta Bianca, by Colombian director Andreas Maldonado, a film based on a true story.

Between 2014 and 2016 Zouaoui takes part in several projects including, Movies, short films, and TV series.

In 2018 he took part in the film Beirut, directed by Brad Anderson with Jon Hamm and Rosamund Pike. The film premiered at the Sundance Film Festival 2018 on January 22.

In the same year he was the absolute protagonist of the Italian-Moroccan film Catharsys or The Afina Tales of the Lost World, presented in competition in several important festivals including the Turin Film Festival and the Marrakech International Film Festival.

In 2019 he starred together with Claudia Gerini in the film Burraco Fatale by Giuliana Gamba

Filmography

Cinema 
 Nuovomondo, directed by Emanuele Crialese (2006) (voice)
 L'ultimo Pulcinella, directed by Maurizio Scaparro (2008)
 I mostri oggi, directed by Enrico Oldoini (2009)
 I fiori di Kirkuk, directed by Fariborz Kamkari (2010)
 Il padre e lo straniero, directed by Ricky Tognazzi (2011)
 Carta bianca, directed by Andres Arce Maldonado (2013)
 Come noi, directed by Enrico Lando (2014)
 Dead on Time, directed by Rish Mustaine
 Florence, Yesterday, directed by Ursula Grisham (2016)
 Aeffetto Domino, directed by F. Massa (2017)
 Beirut, directed by Brad Anderson (2018)

Television 
 Posso chiamarti amore?, directed by Paolo Bianchini (2004)
 Sottocasa (2006)
 Nassiriya - Per non dimenticare, directed by Michele Soavi (2006)
 Liberi di giocare, directed by Francesco Miccichè (2007)
 La ladra, directed by Francesco Vicario (2010)
 Capri, directed by Francesca Marra (2010)
 Un amore e una vendetta, directed by Raffaele Mertes (2011)

Awards 
 Globo d'Oro for Best New Actor
 Chieti Film Festival Flaiano Award
 2011 Poggio mirteto Filmfestival best Foreign actor
 2010 Grand Prix International Best Performance in The Flowers of Kirkuk

References

External links

Living people
21st-century Tunisian male actors
Italian male actors
Tunisian male film actors
Tunisian male television actors
Year of birth missing (living people)
People from Mahdia